Elizabeth Adam McHarg (22 April 1923 – 29 April 1999) was a Scottish mathematician who in 1965 became the first female president of the Edinburgh Mathematical Society.

Education
McHarg studied at the Glasgow High School for Girls and then the University of Glasgow, earning a master's degree with first class honours in mathematics and natural philosophy in 1943. The university awarded her the Thomas Logan Medal and a George A Clark scholarship, funding her as a researcher at Girton College, Cambridge. At Girton, she studied nonlinear partial differential equations with Mary Cartwright, and completed her Ph.D. in 1948.

Career and contributions
McHarg returned to the University of Glasgow as a lecturer in 1948. There, she became an expert in special functions. She also translated the text Differential Equations by Francesco Tricomi from Italian into English; her translation was published in 1961 by Hafner and republished in 2012 by Dover Publications.

References

1923 births
1999 deaths
20th-century Scottish mathematicians
British women mathematicians
Alumni of the University of Glasgow
Alumni of Girton College, Cambridge
Academics of the University of Glasgow
Italian–English translators
20th-century translators
Technical translators
20th-century women mathematicians